Westley Laboucherie (born 6 October 1978) is a Mauritian footballer who currently plays as a midfielder for Savanne SC. He won two caps for the Mauritius national football team in 2002.

References

1978 births
Living people
Mauritian footballers
Mauritius international footballers
Association football midfielders
Savanne SC players